Utrecht is a town in the foothills of the Balele Mountains, in the northwestern corner of KwaZulu-Natal, South Africa. Newcastle, Kwazulu-Natal's third-largest urban centre, is 50 km from Utrecht. Utrecht has a population of approximately 32,000 (including surrounding areas).

The town is named after Utrecht, a Dutch city with the same name, as a result from Dutch settlers in the region.

Coal mining and cattle ranching are the predominant economic activities in Utrecht.

History
In 1843, the British annexed the newly-formed Klip River Republic. Most of the inhabitants moved to the (later) Free State and Transvaal Province, but three of them – A. T. Spies, J. C. Klopper and C. J. van Rooyen – stole land east of the Buffalo River for 300 cattle in 1852 from Zulu King Mpande. Van Rooyen, who spoke the Zulu language fluently, was a friend of King Mpande and had assisted him a few years earlier. Prior to 1852, Van Rooyen had permission to use this tract of land for grazing.

The majority of northern Natal was intermittently uninhabited, since King Shaka had driven out the resident Hlubi people; the Zulu people inhabited the land generally. In the Transvaal Archive, the settlers who moved there with the trio were called the Buffel rivier maatschappij (Buffalo River Society).

In a proclamation dated 27 December 1852 the Zuid-Afrikaansche Republic (ZAR), in a letter signed by Commander-General A. W. J. Pretorius (the hero of the Battle of Blood River), warned them that the ZAR did not recognize the transaction. This was due to a fear of antagonizing the English, who would be their neighbors on the Buffalo River after the annexation of the Klip River Republic. This warning was re-issued in December 1853, in a letter written to "Phillip Koch and the rest of the inhabitants of the area of the Buffalo River". These inhabitants wished to be incorporated into the ZAR, but the ZAR refused. On 8 September 1854 the trio of settlers again traded the same land for a further 100 cattle and had a bill of sale signed; it may be viewed in the Transvaal Archive. The following is a translation from the original Dutch:

Permission to graze the land under traditional Zulu land use system did not equate to ownership as understood in Western terms.

The Republic of Utrecht (after the formation of the New Republic on its eastern side, which had been known as the Old Republic) existed until 1858, when it joined the Republic of Lydenburg. This republic joined the ZAR in 1860. Utrecht and Vryheid (the capital of the former New Republic) remained part of the ZAR until 31 May 1902, when the ZAR surrendered to Great Britain.  After this, both towns (and their districts) were incorporated into the Colony of Natal as spoils of war.

Tourism

In a corner of the Balele Mountains, Utrecht is unique since it lies within a game park. Established in 1854, the town is steeped in a history reflected in historical buildings like the Old Parsonage Museum, the Dutch Reformed sandstone church, the old military cemetery, colonial houses and other buildings.

Utrecht does not only offer history to the tourist; the Balele Mountains, with their waterfalls and ecological diversity, are home to a wealth of fauna and flora – especially in the Balele Game Park, which encircles the town. The preserve and surrounding district offer a variety of outdoor activities that include hiking and horse trails, trout fishing at dams on the Bivane River, birding and water sports at the recreation resort.

The Utrecht district is the tribal domain of five Amakosi (Zulu chiefs), who today play an active role in the development of the area.  The Mangosuthu Arts and Crafts village (with accommodations for backpackers) has a craft shop with a variety of traditional Zulu articles.

In addition to eco-tourism Utrecht is an agricultural area, the most important wool-producing area in KwaZulu-Natal.  It is also a major cattle and mixed-farming region, and farm holidays are available.

Population
Utrecht is the seat of the local eMadlageni municipality and the Amajuba District Municipality.
The Amajuba District Municipality is the fifth-most-densely-populated district in KwaZulu-Natal, comprising Dannhauser (1,516 km2), Newcastle (1,855 km2), and Utrecht (3,539 km2). The average population density in Amajuba was 72 people per km2 in 2011. The district was home to 499,839 people that year with 22% residing in Dannhauser, 72% residing in Newcastle and 7% in Utrecht.

Schools 
 Utrecht High School
 Utrecht Primary School
 eMalahleni Combined School
 Zimbuthu Primary School
 Umzilikazi High School
 Ithamsanqa Primary School
 Mxhakeni Primary School

Bibliography 
 Ian Knight, Companion to the Anglo-Zulu War, 2008.
 Roy Digby Thomas, Two Generals: Buller and Botha in the Boer War, 2012.

References

Populated places in the eMadlangeni Local Municipality
Populated places established in 1853
Former republics